John Bruce (February 16, 1832 – October 1, 1901) was a United States district judge of the United States District Court for the Middle District of Alabama, the United States District Court for the Northern District of Alabama and the United States District Court for the Southern District of Alabama.

Education and career
Born in Stirlingshire, Scotland, Bruce received an Artium Baccalaureus degree from Franklin College in New Athens, Ohio in 1854 and read law to enter the bar in 1856. He was in private practice in Keokuk, Iowa from 1856 to 1862. He was in the Union Army during the American Civil War from 1862 to 1865 and became a colonel. He was a farmer in Prairie Bluff, Alabama from 1866 to 1872, serving as a member of the Alabama House of Representatives from 1872 to 1874.

Federal judicial service

Bruce was nominated by President Ulysses S. Grant on February 23, 1875, to a joint seat on the United States District Court for the Middle District of Alabama, the United States District Court for the Northern District of Alabama and the United States District Court for the Southern District of Alabama vacated by Judge Richard Busteed. He was confirmed by the United States Senate on February 27, 1875, and received his commission the same day. He was reassigned to serve only in the Middle District and Northern District on August 2, 1886. His service terminated on October 1, 1901, due to his death at the Walters Park sanitarium near Wernersville, Pennsylvania.

Note

References

Sources
 

1832 births
1901 deaths
Members of the Alabama House of Representatives
Judges of the United States District Court for the Southern District of Alabama
Judges of the United States District Court for the Northern District of Alabama
Judges of the United States District Court for the Middle District of Alabama
United States federal judges appointed by Ulysses S. Grant
19th-century American judges
Union Army colonels
Scottish emigrants to the United States
United States federal judges admitted to the practice of law by reading law